The FDF Outdoor Center Sletten (Danish: "FDF Friluftscenter Sletten", short: "Sletten") is an outdoor center with a large camping area in Denmark. It belongs to the Danish youth organization FDF.

Activities
The outdoor center is used for various recreational and educational activities. Each Easter and Autumn, FDF hosts annual training courses for young FDF leaders (aged 15–18 years) as well as the FDF National Camp every five years.

Facilities

The area encompasses 225 acres of varied landscape.

The facilities of the center include:
 Course center "Det ny Sletten" (English: "The new Sletten")
 Camp building "Limbjerggård"
 Base camp "Bøgebjerg" with hay barracks
 Sailing center and nature workshop "Æblegården" (English: "Apple Garden"), including an exhibition with the historical collection of FDF
 Old barn with farm environment and workshop houses
 Shelters and many camping areas

See also
Frivilligt Drenge- og Pige-Forbund (FDF)
Fimcap
FDF National Camp

References 

Skanderborg Municipality
Youth work
Fimcap
Youth organizations based in Denmark
Christian summer camps